Matthew Kluger is a disbarred  lawyer serving a 12-year sentence in federal prison for insider trading.  The Bureau of Prisons Inmate Information website states that his expected release date is November 14, 2022.  A graduate of the Hammonasset School, Cornell University, and NYU School of Law, Kluger is the son of Pulitzer Prize-winning writer Richard Kluger.  Over 17 years, while a lawyer at the law firms Cravath, Swaine & Moore, Skadden, Arps, Slate, Meagher & Flom, Fried, Frank, Harris, Shriver & Jacobson, and Wilson Sonsini Goodrich & Rosati, he tipped the identity of planned corporate takeover targets, allowing confederates to reap millions in profits when the proposed takeovers were announced and the stock prices increased. His sentence, which was reportedly the longest ever imposed after a guilty plea for insider trading, was affirmed by the U.S. Court of Appeals for the Third Circuit in 2013.  He explained in detail the nature of his conduct in a video interview. In 2014, he gave an extensive interview with Fortune Magazine about the details of his life in prison.  His conduct was featured on an episode of the CNBC series American Greed.  A motion to vacate his sentence was denied in 2018.

Personal life
Kluger is gay and has three children with a former boyfriend.  Kluger is Jewish.  He is currently housed at RRM Pittsburgh (Residential Re-entry Management, i.e. a halfway house in the Pittsburgh area), Federal Bureau of Prisons inmate number 78142-083.  His scheduled release date is November 14, 2022 when he will be 61 years of age.

References

Living people
American Jews
Cornell University alumni
Disbarred American lawyers
New York University School of Law alumni
Skadden, Arps, Slate, Meagher & Flom people
Cravath, Swaine & Moore people
People associated with Fried, Frank, Harris, Shriver & Jacobson
Year of birth missing (living people)